Araz Abdulla oğlu Abdullayev (born 18 April 1992) is an Azerbaijani footballer who last played as a winger for Azerbaijani club Sumgayit and the Azerbaijan national team.

Career

Club

Early years
Born in Baku, Abdullayev played for Neftchi Baku's youth team from January 2007 to December 2008. He made his first team debut for Neftchi on 5 October 2008.
In the November 2011, Neftchi Baku celebrated its 1000th goal, which is scored by Araz Abdullayev.

Everton
English Premier League club Everton agreed a deal on 4 July 2010 that gave them first option to sign Abdullayev over the next two years if a work permit could be attained. On 21 September, it was announced that he will start on an initial three-year contract, with the option for two more seasons, when the transfer window opens in January 2011. On 7 January 2011, it was announced that Everton signed long-term contract with Abdullayev subject to him being granted a work permit, even though the length of contract is not revealed and allowed him to play for the Neftchi until Azerbaijan Premier League's end. He returned to Everton for their 2011–12 Premier League campaign and featured in Everton Reserves first friendly of the season against Freiburg in the 2011 Lev Yashin Cup

Loan to Panionios
On 27 December 2011, Abdullayev joined Panionios on a season-long loan. He debuted in friendly match on 30 December 2011, against Koropi, Abdullayev played 61 minutes in the starting lineup, Panionios won 3–2. Abdullayev made his Greece Superleague debut for Panionios in a 2–0 home victory against Asteras Tripoli on 3 January 2012.

Return to Neftchi

Abdullayev returned to Neftchi Baku in the summer of 2012 and soon became the main squad player. During the 2012–13 season, he helped his team to become the first Azerbaijani team to advance to the group stage of UEFA Europe League. Neftchi was drawn in Group H alongside Internazionale, Rubin Kazan and Partizan. Araz made five appearances in the UEFA Europa League group stage. On 20 September 2012, Abdullayev made his debut in the UEFA Europa League group stage game against Partizan, entering as a substitute for Flavinho in the 78th minute. The same season, Neftchi Baku won both the Azerbaijan Premier League and Azerbaijan Cup. Abdullayev won the National Cup with Neftchi once again in the 2013–14 season and became a runner-up in 2014–15 and 2015–16 seasons, losing to Qarabağ in the final match both times. During the 4.5 years spent at Neftchi, Araz Abdullayev played a total of 173 games in all tournaments and scored 25 goals.

Araz scored his first European goal against Slovenian Koper in the second qualifying round of the 2014–15 UEFA Europa League. He scored 3 goals in 25 matches during the club's European matches.

Gabala
On 31 December 2016, Abdullayev signed a two-year contract with Gabala. Abdullayev made his Azerbaijan Premier League debut for Gabala played 84 minutes in the starting lineup, in a 1–1 away draw against Kapaz on 28 February 2017.

Loan to Anorthosis
On 12 August 2017, Anorthosis announced the signing of Abdullayev on a season-long loan deal. Abdullayev made his Cypriot First Division debut for Anorthosis played 83 minutes in the starting lineup, in a 1–1 away draw against Nea Salamis on 20 August 2017. He scored his first goal for Anorthosis in the Cypriot First Division match against AEL Limassol in a 1–1 home draw on 25 November 2017.

Panionios
On 7 July 2018, Abdullayev signed a two-year contract with Superleague side Panionios.

Loan to Qarabağ
On 31 August 2018, Qarabağ FK announced the signing of Abdullayev on a two-year loan deal.

Boluspor
On 15 September 2020, Abdullayev signed a 1+1 year contract with Turkish club Boluspor.

Sumgayit
On 15 January 2022, Abdullayev signed for Sumgayit on a contract until the end of the 2021–22 season, with the option of an additional two-years.

International

After a string of impressive performances at club level, Abdullayev was called up to Azerbaijan squad for the 2010 World Cup qualification match against Finland scheduled for 11 October 2008, which made him the youngest ever Azerbaijan international, making his debut at 16 years 4 months.

On 9 March 2017, he scored his first senior international goal for the Azerbaijan national football team, in a 2–1 away win friendly match against Qatar in Jassim Bin Hamad Stadium.

Career statistics

Club

International

Statistics accurate as of match played 8 September 2020

International goals
Scores and results list Azerbaijan's goal tally first.

Honours
Neftchi Baku
Azerbaijan Premier League: 2010–11, 2012–13
Azerbaijan Cup: 2012–13, 2013–14

Qarabağ
Azerbaijan Premier League: 2018–19, 2019–20

References

External links

1992 births
Living people
Footballers from Baku
Azerbaijani footballers
Azerbaijani expatriate footballers
Azerbaijani expatriate sportspeople in England
Azerbaijan international footballers
Association football midfielders
Everton F.C. players
Gabala FC players
Panionios F.C. players
Anorthosis Famagusta F.C. players
Qarabağ FK players
Boluspor footballers
Azerbaijan Premier League players
Super League Greece players
Cypriot First Division players
TFF First League players
Expatriate footballers in England
Expatriate footballers in Greece
Expatriate footballers in Cyprus
Azerbaijan under-21 international footballers
Azerbaijan youth international footballers
Neftçi PFK players